Only in America is a children's television programme that originally aired in 2005 on the CBBC Channel. It is presented by Fearne Cotton and Reggie Yates.

They are sent on a roadtrip of a lifetime around the United States to discover its attractions, starting in Las Vegas, where they find diners, donuts, shoe trees and Elvis impersonators.

Episodes
Series One
 Las Vegas – Fearne Cotton and Reggie Yates hit Vegas, finding diners, donuts and an Elvis lookalike.
 American Dreams – Fearne Cotton and Reggie Yates hit New York in time for the Fourth of July celebrations.
 Space – In a space special, Fearne and Reggie defy gravity, spin into orbit and uncover UFOs.
 Wild West – Fearne Cotton and Reggie Yates wander way out into the Wild West of Arizona.
 Proms – Fearne and Reggie go back to class to find out what American high school is really like.
 Water – Reggie and Fearne wander into the state of Florida and dive into watery fun.
 Summer Camps – Fearne and Reggie hit the summer camps, including basketball camp and fashion camp.
 Animals – The duo get close and personal with American animals, including Jake the Hollywood lion.
 Inventions – The pair meet innovative kid inventors in California, including winners of the National TOYchallenge sponsored by Sally Ride Science, and computer game testers in forward-looking Seattle.
 Superheroes – The bizarre world of superhero conventions, and a Star Wars collection like no other.

References

External links

 
 Only in America – CBBC
 toychallenge Winners Named in national Showcase – http://www.businesswire.com/news/home/20040709005190/en/Kid-TOYchallenge-Winners-Named-National-Showcase,

BBC children's television shows